The red-throated sunbird (Anthreptes rhodolaemus) is a species of bird in the family Nectariniidae.
It is found in Brunei, Indonesia, Malaysia, Myanmar, the Philippines, Singapore, and Thailand.
Its natural habitat is subtropical or tropical moist lowland forests.
It is threatened by habitat loss.

References

red-throated sunbird
Birds of Malesia
red-throated sunbird
Taxonomy articles created by Polbot